Rufodorsia is a genus of epiphytic flowering plants in the family Gesneriaceae. The genus name refers to the reddish back of the upper lobes of the flower. The relationship of Rufodorsia with the genus Oerstedina is uncertain, . It is native to montane cloud forest in Central America.

Description
Rufodorsia species are epiphytic perennial plants, with little-branched upright or hanging stems. The leaves are opposite and of similar sizes with a leathery blade. The inflorescence is an axillary cyme with one to ten flowers. The flowers are short, with fused petals forming a bell shape. The free ends of the petals (lobes) differ: the lowest is larger, making the flower appear two-lipped. The flower is whitish, except for the back of the upper two lobes which is reddish. There are four stamens, included within the flower. The fruit is an almost translucent white berry with fleshy pulp.

Taxonomy
The genus was erected by Hans Joachim Wiehler in 1975 for four species, three new and one originally described in the genus Besleria. The genus name is derived from Latin  'red' and  'back', referring to the reddish back of the flowers. Molecular phylogenetic studies have shown a sister relationship to the genus Oerstedina, and in 2010, Ricardo Kriebel transferred one species from Oerstedina to Rufodorsia as Rufodorsia cerricola. However, the other two species of Oerstedina have not been formally transferred , so the two genera are not fully synonymized.

Species
Four species were originally placed in the genus, and are recognized in a 2020 list of New World members of the family Gesneriaceae, as well as by Plants of the World Online :
Rufodorsia congestiflora (Donn.Sm.) Wiehler
Rufodorsia intermedia Wiehler
Rufodorsia major Wiehler
Rufodorsia minor Wiehler
One additional species transferred from Oerstedina is accepted by Plants of the World Online :
Rufodorsia cerricola (Wiehler) Kriebel = Oerstedina cerricola Wiehler

Distribution and habitat
The four original species of Rufodorsia are native to Central America, from Nicaragua through Costa Rica to Panama.

References

Gesnerioideae
Gesneriaceae genera